The Men's Individual Road Race of the 2008 UCI Road World Championships cycling event took place on September 28 in Varese, Italy. The course comprised 15 laps around 17.35-kilometre route, making a total distance of 260.25 km. Each lap featured two ascents: the first at Via Montello (6.5% gradient for 1.15 kilometres); and the second at Ronchi (4.5% for 3.13 kilometres). The highest elevation measured  at Via Montello.

Pre-race favourites included Paolo Bettini, who was trying for an unprecedented third consecutive title, and the 1999, 2001 and 2004 champion Óscar Freire.

The race was won by Alessandro Ballan, with his fellow Italian Damiano Cunego in second and Matti Breschel of Denmark taking the bronze medal.

Final classification

Did not finish
128 riders failed to finish the race. Levi Leipheimer of the United States did not start the race.

Nation qualification

References

External links
Varese 2008 home page

Men's Road Race
UCI Road World Championships – Men's road race